Bunodophoron crespoae is a species of ground-dwelling, fruticose lichen in the family Sphaerophoraceae. It is found in the Páramo of south-east Colombia, growing in association with moss.

Taxonomy
The lichen was formally described as a new species in 2018 by Edier Soto Medina, Maria Prieto, and Mats Wedin. The species epithet honours Spanish lichenologist Ana Crespo.

Description
The ascomata (spore-bearing structures) are sparse, usually occurring at the ends of the branches. They measure 0.8–2.2 mm wide. Ascospores are pale greyish to dark grey and have typical dimensions of 4.5 by 6.3 μm. Pycnidia are common, and occur at the tips of the small terminal branches (branchlets). Sphaerophorin, stictic acid, and constictic acid  are lichen products that occur in this species.

References

Lecanorales
Lichen species
Lichens described in 2018
Lichens of Colombia